, also known as EBC, is a Japanese broadcast network affiliated with the FNN/FNS . Their headquarters are located in Matsuyama, Ehime Prefecture.

History
1969 December 10: It was set up as Ehime Prefecture's second broadcasting station.
2006 October 1: Digital transmission was started from their Matsuyama Main Station.

Stations

Analog Stations 
Matsuyama (Main Station) JOEI-TV 37ch

Digital Stations (ID:8)
Matsuyama (Main Station) JOEI-DTV 27ch

Rival Stations
Nankai Broadcasting (RNB)
i-Television (ITV)
Ehime Asahi Television (eat)

Other Links
Television Ehime official site

Companies based in Ehime Prefecture
Fuji News Network
Television stations in Japan
Television channels and stations established in 1969
Mass media in Matsuyama, Ehime